Luis Frías may refer to:

Luis Frías (baseball) (born 1998), Dominican Republic baseball pitcher
Luiz Frias (born 1964), Brazilian business chairman